The Peter Gzowski Award 
(originally styled the Peter Gzowski Literacy Award of Merit)
is an 
award given annually by Peter Gzowski Invitational
in memory of Peter Gzowski
to recognize contributions to adult literacy in Canada.

Winners

References

Awards established in 1993
Literacy-related awards
Canadian awards